Delhi most commonly refers to:
 Delhi, a city and union territory of India
 New Delhi, the capital of India, located in the union territory of Delhi

Delhi may also refer to:

Places 
India
 Delhi Cantonment, a town in the National Capital Territory of Delhi
 Delhi Sultanate, an empire that dominated much of India
 New Delhi, urban area within the metropolis of Delhi which is the seat of the government of India
 Old Delhi, capital of the Mughals during the Mughal dynasty
 Delhi Subah, an imperial Mughal province based at (Old) Delhi, renamed Shahjahanbad in 1648
 Delhi Territory, division of British India

United States
 Delhi, Illinois, an unincorporated community
 Delhi, California, a census-designated place
 Delhi, Colorado, an unincorporated town
 Delhi, Georgia, an unincorporated community
 Delhi, Iowa, a city
 Delhi, Louisiana, a town
 Delhi, Minnesota, a city
 Delhi, Missouri, an unincorporated community
 Delhi, New York, a town
 Delhi (village), New York, county seat of Delaware County
 Delhi, Oklahoma an unincorporated community
 Delhi, Texas, an unincorporated community
 Delhi, Wisconsin, a ghost town
 Delhi Charter Township, Michigan, a charter township
 Delhi Dam, a dam in Iowa
 Delhi Township, Minnesota, a township of Redwood County
 Delhi Township, Hamilton County, Ohio, a township
Canada
 Delhi, Ontario, an unincorporated community

China
 Delingha, also known as Delhi, a city in and the seat of the Haixi Mongol and Tibetan Autonomous Prefecture

Other uses 
 Delhi (horse), Thoroughbred racehorse and winner of 1904 Belmont Stakes
 Delhi: A Novel, a historical work of semi-fiction by Khushwant Singh
 HMS Delhi, three ships of the Royal Navy
 Delhi Maru, a Japanese merchant ship, the first to be converted into a Q-ship in 1944.

See also 
 Deli (disambiguation)
 Dilli (disambiguation)
 Dehlavi